Razayevka (Raziya) is a rural locality (a village) in Kenger-Meneuzovsky Selsoviet, Bizhbulyaksky District, Bashkortostan, Russia. The population was 80 as of 2010. There is 1 street.

Geography 
Razayevka is located 20 km northeast of Bizhbulyak (the district's administrative centre) by road. Ittikhat is the nearest rural locality.

References 

Rural localities in Bizhbulyaksky District